The Boerperd is a modern breed of horse from South Africa. It is a re-creation of the traditional Cape Horse or old-type Boer Horse, which is now extinct.

History 

The origins of the Cape Horse go back to horses imported to southern Africa from Java in 1653. Between 1770 and 1790 there was some cross-breeding with Thoroughbreds. Many Cape Horses were exported to India in the nineteenth century. The first horses to be imported into Australia were of this breed, which thus contributed to the evolution of the Australian Waler. The Basuto pony and Namaqua Pony also derive from it.

During the Boer Wars between 1880 and 1902, many old-type Boer horses were killed: some died in the fighting, while others were shot on Boer farms. By the end of the wars, numbers were greatly reduced and conservation efforts began. From 1905 until about 1920 the horses could be registered with the horse-breeders' association of Transvaal.

A breeders' association, the Kaapse Boerperd Breeders' Society of South Africa, was formed in 1948. A separate association, the Boerperd Society of South Africa, formed in 1973. It became the Historiese Boerperd Breeders Society in 1977, and SA Boerperd in 1998. The Historiese Boerperd was officially recognised by the Department of Agriculture in 1996. Both associations are members of the SA Stud Book Association.

References

Horse breeds
Horse breeds originating in South Africa
Afrikaans words and phrases